This is a list of executions in Iran in 2016.

List of executions in Iran in 2016

References

2016 in Iran
Murder in Iran
2016-related lists
 
Iran-related lists